NK Belišće is a Croatian football club based in the town of Belišće.

History 
NK Belišće was founded in 1919 under the name BŠK (Belišćanski športski klub). The club's name was changed in 1925 to BRŠK (Belišćanski radnički športski klub). During World War II the club was named Viktorija. From 1945 until the 1960 club was called FD Proleter and from 1960 carries the current name. The club from its beginnings until today, closely related to the factory "Belišće" d.d.

Stadium 
NK Belišće host domestic matches at Gradski stadion Belišće which has a capacity of 3,000.

Supporters 
The team's fans are known as Baraberi. The most passionate group of Baraberi encourages their favorites wherever they played, and on the home match at the Gradski stadion is located on the eastern stand.

Recent seasons

Current squad

References

External links 
  
NK Belišće at Nogometni magazin 

 
Association football clubs established in 1919
Belišće
Football clubs in Osijek-Baranja County
1919 establishments in Croatia